Cheshmeh Mirza (also Romanized as Cheshmeh Mīrzā; also known as Roshnow) is a village in Kunani Rural District, Kunani District, Kuhdasht County, Lorestan Province, Iran. At the 2006 census, its population was 151, in 29 families.

References 

Towns and villages in Kuhdasht County